Fielding may refer to:

 Fielding (cricket), the action of fielders collecting the ball in cricket at various positions
 Fielding (baseball), the action of fielders collecting the ball at any of the nine positions
 Fielding (surname)
 Fielding, Iowa, an unincorporated community, United States
 Fielding, Queensland, a locality in the Shire of Carpentaria, Queensland, Australia
 Fielding, Saskatchewan, an unincorporated area, Canada
 Fielding, Utah, a town, United States
 Fielding Bradford House, Kentucky, United States
 Fielding Graduate University, a graduate institution in  Santa Barbara, California, United States
 Fielding Mellish, played by Woody Allen in the movie Bananas

See also
Fielding percentage and fielding error
Affair of Fielding and Bylandt
Fielder (disambiguation)
Feilding, town in New Zealand